Sir Robert David Hillyer Scott (born 22 January 1944) is an English businessman in South London who is noted for his involvement with the International Olympic Committee. Scott was Chairman of the Manchester Olympic Bid Committee's unsuccessful bids in 1996 and 2000, as well as the successful November 1995 bid to play host to the 2002 Commonwealth Games. Scott was knighted in 1994 New Year Honours.

Early life and education
Scott was born in Minehead, Somerset, the eldest son of diplomat Sir David Aubrey Scott  and Vera Kathleen Ibbitson. He has a younger brother, Andrew, and a sister, Diana, married Sir Brian Unwin. Timothy Frank Siward Scott   was his uncle. He attended Haileybury and Imperial Service College and Merton College, Oxford where he studied dramatic arts.

Career 
Scott became Administrator of the 69 Theatre Company in Manchester in 1968. He later became Administrator of the Royal Exchange Theatre Trust. As Managing Director of Manchester Theatres Limited he revived two major theatres in the city – the Palace (1981) and Opera House (1984).

In 2008, he was appointed Chairman of the European Commission jury to select the European Capital of Culture.  He was Chairman of Trinity Laban (from 2005-2012), Greenwich Theatre and South London Business.  In June 2003, he led Liverpool’s successful Bid to become the European Capital of Culture in 2008, and then was appointed the International Ambassador of the Liverpool Culture Company.   In Manchester he is Chairman of the Granada Foundation.

He founded Cornerhouse, Manchester.  He has been a Governor of the Royal Northern College of Music, a Director of the Buxton Festival, the Halle Orchestra and the Whitworth Art Gallery.  He was a Board Member of the Central Manchester Development Corporation from 1988 to 1996.

Recognition
Scott was made a Knight Bachelor in the 1994 New Year Honours, for services to sport and to the community in Manchester.

He has received honorary degrees from Manchester University in 1988 and from Salford University in 1991.  He was made an Honorary Fellow of Manchester Polytechnic (1987), UMIST (1988), the Royal Northern College of Music (1990), and received an honorary doctorate by the University of Greenwich (2003) and an Honorary Fellowship by Liverpool John Moores University (2003).  He was a deputy lieutenant of the County of Greater Manchester from 1988 to 1997.

On 16 July 2010, Sir Bob received his honorary doctorate in arts from Leeds Metropolitan University's Carnegie Faculty of Sport and Education.

Personal life
Scott has been married twice. In 1972, he married Su Dalgleish, and had two sons and a daughter before divorcing in 1995. He married secondly to Alicia Tomalino in 1995, and has a further two stepchildren.

References 

1944 births
Living people
People educated at Haileybury and Imperial Service College
Alumni of Merton College, Oxford
People from Minehead
Sport in Manchester
Culture in Manchester
Knights Bachelor
People in sports awarded knighthoods
2002 Commonwealth Games